Ruth Vanita is an Indian academic, activist and author who specialises in British and Indian literary history with a focus on gender and sexuality studies. She also teaches and writes on Hindu philosophy.

Early life and education 
Vanita earned her BA, MA and PhD in English at Delhi University.

Career 
From 1994 to 1997 Vanita was Reader in the Department of English at Delhi University. She is now a professor of English and World Cultures at the University of Montana, where she directs the program in South & South-East Asian Studies.

While living in Delhi in 1978, Vanita co-founded Manushi: A Journal about Women and Society, a journal that combined academic research and grassroots activism. She served as the journal's unpaid, volunteer co-editor from 1979 to 1991.

Major publications

Books
1994: A Play of Light: Selected Poems
1996: Sappho and the Virgin Mary: Same-Sex Love and the English Literary Imagination
2005: Love's Rite: Same-Sex Marriage in India and the West
2005: Gandhi's Tiger and Sita's Smile: Essays on Gender, Sexuality and Culture
2012: Gender, Sex and the City: Urdu Rekhti Poetry in India 1780-1870
2017: Dancing with the Nation: Courtesans in Bombay Cinema
2020: Memory of Light (a novel)

Edited volumes
1991 (ed. with Madhu Kishwar): In Search of Answers: Indian Women's Voices from Manushi
2000 (ed. with Saleem Kidwai): Same-Sex love in India: Readings from Literature and History
2002 (ed.): Queering India: Same-Sex Love and Eroticism in Indian Culture and Society
2014 (ed.): India and the World: Postcolonialism, Translation and Indian Literature – Essays in Honour of Professor Harish Trivedi

Translations
1994: Yadav, Rajendra: Strangers on the Roof, translated by Ruth Vanita, Penguin India, 1994 (updated edition with a new introduction 2014)
1997: Detha, Vijay Dan. Dilemma and Other Stories
2003: Bhandari, Mannu: The Great Feast (Mahabhoj)
2006: Sharma, Pandey Bechan ("Ugra"): Chocolate and Other Stories on Male-Male Desire
2007: About Me (Apni Khabar) (autobiography of Pande Bechan Sharma Ugra)
2008: The Co-Wife and Other Stories by Premchand
2013: Alone Together: Selected Stories of Mannu Bhandari, Rajee Seth and Archana Varma
2021: My Family by Mahadevi Varma

References

External links
 Ayyar, Raj. (2001-03-05). "Reclaiming Gay India with Ruth Vanita". GayToday. Retrieved on 2007-07-11.
 "Gay historians: Ruth Vanita and Saleem Kidwai," QueerIndia, 5 March 2005

1955 births
Indian women science writers
Lesbian writers
Indian LGBT rights activists
Indian LGBT writers
Living people
Postmodern feminists
University of Montana faculty
Writers from Delhi
20th-century Indian translators
Indian social sciences writers
20th-century Indian women writers
20th-century Indian social scientists
20th-century Indian non-fiction writers
Indian women translators
Women writers from Delhi
Historians of LGBT topics
Indian women historians
21st-century Indian historians
20th-century Indian historians
LGBT historians
Lesbian academics
Indian expatriate academics
Expatriate academics in the United States